Tom Arnold is an Irish agricultural economist and public policy advisor who has worked in the Irish civil service and served on various non-governmental organisations and public forums, mainly in the area of food security.

Education
Arnold has a degree in agricultural economics from University College Dublin, an MBA from the Université catholique de Louvain, and a master's in strategic management from Trinity College Dublin.

Career
In August 2014, Arnold accepted a request from the UN to coordinate the Scaling Up Nutrition Movement  (SUN Movement), which brings together governments, civil society and the private sector, to improve nutrition at national and international level. The request was made following the appointment by UN Secretary-General Ban Ki-moon of Dr David Nabarro, the current coordinator of the SUN Movement, to be the UN system's senior coordinator of the response to the Ebola virus disease. In Dr Nabarro's absence as SUN coordinator, Arnold was to provide strategic leadership to the SUN Movement, working closely with the existing SUN networks and the SUN secretariat, based in Geneva. The appointment was for a six-month period, starting 1 September 2014.

Arnold was director general of the Institute of International and European Affairs from 2013 to 2017. From 2012 to 2014, Arnold was chairman of Ireland's Constitutional Convention. Arnold served as chief executive officer of Concern Worldwide, Ireland's largest humanitarian aid agency, from October 2001 to February 2013.

As a civil servant, he served as assistant secretary-general and chief economist with the Irish Department of Agriculture, (1988–2001) and senior economist with the Irish farm advisory service, ACOT.

In May 2018, Arnold was appointed chair of Task Force Rural Africa, a joint effort of the EU and the African Union to improve Africa's food production. The body was tasked with producing recommendations by the end of the year.

Boards and committees
Arnold has presided (as chair, coordinator, director-general, etc.) over:-
 The Irish Times Trust.
 Mary Robinson Foundation from Climate Justice.
 The Irish Times group's governing board and trust.
 Irish Council of the European Movement (1991–93); 
 EuronAid, a food security NGO network, (1992–96);
 the OECD's agriculture committee (1993–98).
 The Institute of International and European Affairs, an Irish think-tank
 The United Nations Scaling Up Nutrition (SUN) Movement

He has been a member of:-
 Mary Robinson Foundation board
 Consultative Group for International Agricultural Research consortium board 
 Central Emergency Response Fund advisory board
 International Food Policy Research Institute advisory council
 Sight and Life Foundation board member

Awards
Arnold received honorary doctorates from the National University of Ireland in 2009 and University College Dublin in 2010, and a People of the Year Award in 2013.

References

Living people
20th-century Irish economists
21st-century Irish economists
Alumni of University College Dublin
Alumni of Trinity College Dublin
Catholic University of Leuven (1834–1968) alumni
Irish humanitarians
Year of birth missing (living people)
Place of birth missing (living people)
The Irish Times people